"Anteater" properly refers to the four species of the suborder Vermilingua native to Mexico, Central America, and tropical South America. This includes two species of Tamandua (Silky Anteaters) and the Giant Anteater.

Anteater can also refer to any of several unrelated species which have independently and convergently adapted to fill the same niche of eating ants or termites:

 Aardvark (Cape anteater), a medium-sized placental mammal native to Africa
 Echidna (spiny anteater), a family of monotremes native to New Guinea and Australia
 Numbat (formerly Banded Anteater), a small marsupial endemic to western Australia
 Pangolin (scaly anteater), placental mammals found in tropical regions of Africa and Asia

Other uses
 AnteAter, an electronica side-project of ¡Forward, Russia! singer Tom Woodhead
 Ant-eater, B.C. (comic strip) character
 Anteater (video game), a 1982 arcade game
 UC Irvine Anteaters, the sports teams of the University of California, Irvine
 Kenworth T600, semi-trailer truck with a design that gives it this nickname
 Anteater, an error code in Destiny 2

Animal common name disambiguation pages